ISO 3977 is an international standard related to the design and procurement of gas turbine system applications. ISO 3977 is based primarily on the ASME 133 series on gas turbines, as well as the API 616 and API 11PGT standards. The standard environmental design point of any gas turbine system is 15 °C, 60% relative humidity, and sea level elevation. The standard is divided into eight parts and covers procurement, design requirements, installation, and reliability.

Parts
 ISO 3977-1:1997 Part 1: General introduction and definitions
 ISO 3977-2:1997 Part 2: Standard reference conditions and ratings
 ISO 3977-3:2004 Part 3: Design requirements
 ISO 3977-4:2002 Part 4: Fuels and environment
 ISO 3977-5:2001 Part 5: Applications for petroleum and natural gas industries
 ISO 3977-7:2002 Part 7: Technical information
 ISO 3977-8:2002 Part 8: Inspection, testing, installation and commissioning
 ISO 3977-9:1999 Part 9: Reliability, availability, maintainability and safety

External links

Related ISO Bulletin article, February 2000.

03977